Mimi River may refer to:

 Mimi River (Japan)
 Mimi River (New Zealand)

See also 
 Mimi (disambiguation)